Sofiane el Azizi (born 15 April 1979) is an Algerian fencer. He competed in the individual foil event at the 2004 Summer Olympics.

References

External links
 

1979 births
Living people
Algerian male foil fencers
Olympic fencers of Algeria
Fencers at the 2004 Summer Olympics
21st-century Algerian people